Dierogekko is a genus of geckos in the family Diplodactylidae. The genus is endemic to the northwest portion of New Caledonia. They are sometimes known commonly as the striped geckos or the New Caledonian geckos. Dierogekko are small geckos with simple, granular scales and subdued patterning of broad longitudinal stripes or spots. They are similar in overall appearance and habit to closely related geckos in the genera Bavayia and Oedodera, and the type species D. validiclavis was once referred to Bavayia. 

Dierogekko species occur in small, fragmented areas of humid forests and dry maquis shrubland in the ultramafic massifs of Province Nord. They are among the most threatened lizards in the world; of the nine species, five are critically endangered, three are endangered, and one is data deficient and known from only a single specimen. Threats include habitat destruction by operational and planned nickel mines, and predation, competition, or habitat degradation by introduced species (rats, cats, deer, pigs, fire ants, Hemidactylus frenatus).

Species
The genus Dierogekko contains nine species recognized as being valid:
Dierogekko baaba Skipwith, Jackman, Whitaker, Bauer & Sadlier, 2014
Dierogekko inexpectatus Bauer, Jackman, Sadlier & Whitaker, 2006
Dierogekko insularis Bauer, Jackman, Sadlier & Whitaker, 2006 – Islands striped gecko
Dierogekko kaalaensis Bauer, Jackman, Sadlier & Whitaker, 2006 – Kaala striped gecko
Dierogekko koniambo Bauer, Jackman, Sadlier & Whitaker, 2006 – Koniambo striped gecko
Dierogekko nehoueensis Bauer, Jackman, Sadlier & Whitaker, 2006 – striped gecko
Dierogekko poumensis Bauer, Jackman, Sadlier & Whitaker, 2006 – Poum striped gecko
Dierogekko thomaswhitei Bauer, Jackman, Sadlier & Whitaker, 2006 –Taom striped gecko
Dierogekko validiclavis (Sadlier, 1988) – bold-striped gecko

References

Further reading
Bauer AM, Jackman T, Sadlier RA, Whitaker AH (2006). "A Revision of the Bavayia viridiclavis group (Squamata: Gekkota: Diplodactylidae), a Clade of New Caledonian Geckos Exhibiting Microendemism". Proceedings of the California Academy of Sciences 57 (18): 503–547. (Dierogekko, new genus, p. 507).

 
Lizard genera
Geckos of New Caledonia
Endemic fauna of New Caledonia
Taxa named by Aaron M. Bauer
Taxa named by Todd R. Jackman
Taxa named by Ross Allen Sadlier
Taxa named by Anthony Whitaker